("Irish Institute")  is a public body responsible for the promotion of the Irish language throughout the island of Ireland, including both the Republic of Ireland and Northern Ireland. It was set up on 2 December 1999, assuming the roles of the Irish language board  (including the book distributor ), the publisher , and the terminological committee , all three of which had formerly been state bodies of the Irish government.

Functions
 Promotion of the Irish language;
 Facilitating and encouraging its use in speech and writing in public and private life in the Republic of Ireland and, in the context of Part III of the European Charter for Regional or Minority Languages, in Northern Ireland where there is appropriate demand;
 Advising both administrations, public bodies and other groups in the private and voluntary sectors;
 Undertaking supportive projects, and grant-aiding bodies and groups as considered necessary;
 Undertaking research, promotional campaigns, and public and media relations;
 Developing terminology and dictionaries;
 Supporting Irish-medium education and the teaching of Irish.

The North South Ministerial Council (NSMC) was established under the Belfast/Good Friday Agreement (1998), to develop consultation, co-operation and action within the island of Ireland. The Language Body (consisting of two agencies i.e. Foras na Gaeilge and Tha Boord o Ulster-Scotch) was one of six North South Implementation Bodies which were set up and operate on an all-island basis. While having a clear operational remit, all operate under the overall policy direction of the North South Ministerial Council, with clear accountability lines back to the council and to the Oireachtas and the Northern Ireland Assembly.

See also
Irish language in Northern Ireland
European Charter for Regional or Minority Languages
British-Irish Council
Languages in the United Kingdom
Language revival
Bòrd na Gàidhlig (Scotland)
An Coimisinéir Teanga

External links
Official website 
Official website 

Irish language organisations
Language regulators
Organisations based in Belfast
Organisations based in Dublin (city)
1999 establishments in Ireland
1999 establishments in Northern Ireland
Organizations established in 1999
All-Ireland organisations
Republic of Ireland at the 1994 FIFA World Cup
Football songs and chants
Department of Tourism, Culture, Arts, Gaeltacht, Sport and Media